J.M. Weston is a French luxury shoe company founded by Édouard Blanchard in 1891 in Limoges.

Products
The company is renowned for its handmade shoes for men.  They also produce a full line of leather goods ranging from belts and briefcases to luggage items. 

The company's most famous models are the 677 Chasse (a sturdy outdoor shoe), 598 Demi-Chasse (a dressier version of the Chasse), and the 180 Mocassin (a classic penny loafer).  

J.M. Weston shoes are sold in its own boutiques, or in luxury department stores such as Harvey Nichols.

External links
Official Website
Eastbay Kicks

Shoe brands
Shoe companies of France
Clothing companies established in 1927
1927 establishments in France